Mesolita simplicicollis is a species of beetle in the family Cerambycidae. It was described by Per Olof Christopher Aurivillius in 1920. It is known from Australia.

References

Parmenini
Beetles described in 1920